Durafour is a surname. Notable people with the surname include: 

Antoine Durafour (1876–1932), French politician
Michel Durafour (1920–2017), French politician